Prehype is a venture development firm that focuses on building products and companies through collaboration with corporations and venture capitalists. The firm allows large companies to benefit from the energy and creativity of entrepreneurship without losing the organizational domain expertise and control. Prehype has offices in New York City, London, Copenhagen, and Rio de Janeiro, and was founded by Henrik Werdelin in September 2010. In addition to venture management services, the firm provides angel investments and access to a network of talent including entrepreneurs, engineers, designers, and developers.

Incubation services
The firm's primary line of services involves incubating new startup companies from within large corporations. With an infrastructure of entrepreneurs, engineers, designers, and developers, Prehype facilitates the incubation process by allowing executives, referred to as intrapreneurs, to build new products and ventures with a handpicked external team. Prehype pulls these entrepreneurs out of the company for a period of 1–4 weeks and coaches them in bringing a business idea to life. Following this period a new venture is created with a timeline of three months for most projects. Prehype follows up by helping companies receive customer feedback within 100 days of the new product's launch. Prehype charges a fixed management fee, but makes its profits via a shared upside if the project is successful.

The incubation process serves several purposes, the first of which is to retain talent within an organization while allowing employees to function like entrepreneurs, potentially leading to a successful new business. The second goal is to foster a mutually beneficial environment in which the cultures of big companies and startups can learn from one another.

After launch
Upon the completion of a Prehype project, the company that has contracted the firm's services is given the choice to internalize or spin out the new product as a stand-alone startup.

Advantages of intrapreneurship
Compared to reaching outside an organization to expand into a new area of business, Prehype's method of leveraging an organization's existing human resources presents some distinct advantages. When a company actively supports employees with the intellectual engagement and appreciation associated with incubating a startup, those employees might in turn support the company with strong collaboration, loyalty, and camaraderie. Additionally, the Prehype methodology is a potential means of simultaneously testing ideas and increasing career satisfaction among corporate workers.

Noteworthy projects

BarkBox
Prehype partnered with Matt Meeker and Carly Strife in September 2011 to develop a new business called BarkBox. The Prehype incubated business is a subscription service that delivers monthly boxes of dog products to pet owners. With a model similar to Birchbox, BarkBox collaborates with local vendors to provide products like treats, accessories, and gadgets.

References

External links
 Prehype.com

Venture capital firms of the United States
Financial services companies established in 2010
2010 establishments in New York City